Tiemannite is a mineral, mercury selenide, formula HgSe. It occurs in hydrothermal veins associated with other selenides, or other mercury minerals such as cinnabar, and often with calcite. Discovered in 1855 in Germany, it is named after Johann Carl Wilhelm Tiemann (1848–1899).

See also
List of minerals
List of minerals named after people

References

 Tiemannite from a micro-disseminated gold deposit in Qiongmo, Liu Jiajun, Zheng Minghua, Liu Jianming, Lu Wenquan, Journal of Chengdu Institute of Technology, vol. 23 (2), pages 21–28 (1996)
 Timanite and onofrite in ores of Siberian mercury deposits, Vasil'yev V.I., Lavrent'yev Y.G., Doklady (Academy of Sciences of the USSR, Earth Sciences Section) vol. 222, Pages 159-162 (1975).

External links

Mercury(II) minerals
Selenide minerals
Cubic minerals
Minerals in space group 216
Minerals described in 1855